Behold, Rejoice! Surfernando Is Hear Nah. is the major-label debut album by Eraserheads member Marcus Adoro, under the name Markus Highway. The album's full English translation is "Behold, Rejoice! Surfernando Is Here Now." According to Adoro, Surfernando is a character. Also, according to him, the sound of Markus Highway ranges from just him and a guitar "to a big full band with horns section and all."

The album was released under Warner Music. The album was recorded from 2006 to 2007 and most of the songs have been written since 2003.

The song "Rakenrol" was released as a single and its video had some airplay on myx. Adoro's second single "American Gurl" remained number 1 in NU107's charts for a few days along with Sandwich's Betamax and Pupil's Disconnection Notice.

Track listing
 "Lala" - 3:11
 "Batch 88" - 1:46
 "Ingat" - 3:53
 "Wow Kalabaw" - 4:01
 "Dubi" - 6:19
 "Bonfire" - 3:35
 "Rakenrol" - 4:45
 "Drivethru" - 4:57
 "American Gurl" - 3:02
 "I Remember" - 4:22
 "Miss Nurse" - 5:18
 "Weekend Warrior Blues" - 4:21

2008 debut albums